Dorian Jones (born 27 September) is a Welsh rugby union player, who currently plays for Union Sportive Carcassonnaise in Rugby Pro D2 (France).

During the 21/22 season for US Carcassonne Jones kicked 39/41 of his attempts for goal (95% succession).

Personal
His Brother is Ex-Wales U20s and Wales 7s rugby union player Rhys Jones.

His Father is former Wales international flanker Kingsley Jones.

His Grandfather Phil Kingsley Jones is former manager of New Zealand rugby union player Jonah Lomu.

References 

 
 https://www.southwalesargus.co.uk/news/19877344.ex-dragons-fly-half-dorian-jones-thriving-frances-pro-d2/
 https://www.walesonline.co.uk/sport/rugby/rugby-news/only-two-welshmen-left-french-18203750
 https://www.bbc.co.uk/sport/rugby-union/44255357
 https://www.wru.wales/article/dorian-making-the-most-of-french-living/
 https://www.walesonline.co.uk/sport/rugby/rugby-news/welsh-rugby-judgement-day-dragons-9109008

External links 
Dragons profile

Rugby union players from Abergavenny
Welsh rugby union players
Dragons RFC players
Living people
1991 births
Cross Keys RFC players
Ebbw Vale RFC players
Welsh expatriate sportspeople in France
Expatriate rugby union players in France
Welsh expatriate rugby union players
Rugby union fly-halves
US Carcassonne players
Soyaux Angoulême XV Charente players
Worcester Warriors players